The Seeztal (or Seez Valley) is a valley of the canton of St. Gallen, Switzerland, extending to the east of Lake Walen for some 10 km, formed by the river Seez. The valley appears to be a left branch off the Rhine valley at Sargans, but there is a divide at Mels. Situated in the Seeztal are the municipalities of Walenstadt (425 m), Flums (453 m) and Mels (500 m).

Running along the valley are the A3 motorway and the Chur-Zürich railway line. As a consequence, the Seeztal is well connected to Greater Zurich, the journey by train from Zurich Airport to Mels taking some 90 minutes.

Valleys of Switzerland
Aare
Landforms of the canton of St. Gallen